Nikolai Kamov may refer to:
 Nikolai Kamov (politician)
 Nikolai Kamov (engineer)